The 2019 Cotswold District Council election took place on 2 May 2019 to elect all members of Cotswold District Council, as part of the United Kingdom local elections. The Conservatives had controlled the council since 2003 but lost ten seats. The Liberal Democrats won overall control of the council for the first time since local government reorganisation in 1973.

Summary

Election result

|-

Ward results

Abbey Ward

Blockley Ward

Bourton Vale Ward

Bourton Village Ward

Campden and Vale Ward

Chedworth and Churn Valley Ward

Chesterton Ward

Coln Valley Ward

Ermin Ward

Fairford North Ward

Fosseridge Ward

Four Acres Ward

Grumbolds Ash with Avening Ward

Kemble Ward

Lechlade, Kempsford and Fairford South Ward

Moreton East Ward

Moreton West Ward

New Mills Ward

Northleach Ward

Sandywell Ward

Siddington and Cerney Rural Ward

South Cerney Village Ward

St Michael's Ward

Stow Ward

Stratton Ward

Tetbury East and Rural Ward

Tetbury Town Ward

Tetbury with Upton Ward

The Ampneys and Hampton Ward

The Beeches Ward

The Rissingtons Ward

Watermoor Ward

By-elections

Fosseridge

Campden and Vale

References

Cotswold
Cotswold District Council elections
2010s in the Cotswolds